Zakes Makgona Mokae (5 August 1934 – 11 September 2009) was a South African-American actor of theatre and film.

Life and career
Mokae was born in Johannesburg, South Africa, moved to the United Kingdom in 1961, and to the United States in 1969. He turned to acting at the same time as playwright Athol Fugard was emerging. The two worked together on Fugard's play, The Blood Knot, from 1961, a two-hander set in South Africa about brothers with the same mother but different fathers; Zach (played by Mokae) is dark skinned and Morris (played by Fugard) is fair skinned. Later Mokae worked with Fugard on the play "Master Harold"...and the Boys, for which Mokae won the 1982 Tony Award for  Featured Actor in a Play. The play was filmed for television in 1985 with Mokae and Matthew Broderick. In 1993 Mokae was nominated for a second Tony Award for  Featured Actor in a Play for The Song of Jacob Zulu by Tug Yourgrau.

His early film roles included Darling (1965) as a guest at a wild party, and The Comedians (1967) starring Richard Burton and Elizabeth Taylor. His major films are split between anti-apartheid films such as Cry Freedom (1987) and A Dry White Season (1989), and cult horror films such as The Island (1980), Dust Devil (1993), The Serpent and the Rainbow (1988) and Vampire in Brooklyn (1995), the latter two directed by horror icon Wes Craven. He also appeared in character roles in many other films including Gross Anatomy (1989), Dad (1989), A Rage in Harlem (1991), Outbreak (1995) and the Kevin Costner film Waterworld (1995). On television, he has been a guest actor in many series such as The West Wing, Starsky and Hutch, Danger Man, The X-Files, Oz, Monk, A Different World and Knight Rider.

In 1975, American writer-filmmaker Eon Chontay Cjohnathan gave birth to Zakes Mokae's only child, Santlo (after Mokae's mother) Chontay Mokae.

In later years, Mokae worked as a theatre director for American companies including the Nevada Shakespeare Company. Mokae died from complications of a stroke on 11 September 2009 in Las Vegas.

Partial filmography
 1957 Donker Afrika as Sergeant
 1961 Tremor
 1962 Dilemma as Steven Sitole
 1965 Darling as Black Man At French Party (uncredited)
 1967 The Comedians as Michel
 1970 Fragment of Fear (uncredited)
 1970 The Rise and Rise of Michael Rimmer as Mugger (uncredited)
 1976 The River Niger as "Dutch"
 1980 The Island as Wescott
 1981 Roar as Committee Member 
 1985 Master Harold...and the Boys (TV Movie) as Sam 
 1987 Cry Freedom as Father Kani
 1988 The Serpent and the Rainbow as Captain Dargent Peytraud
 1989 A Dry White Season as Stanley Makhaya
 1989 Gross Anatomy as Dr. Banumbra
 1989 Dad as Dr. Chad
 1991 A Rage in Harlem "Big Kathy"
 1991 Body Parts as Detective Sawchuck
 1991 The Doctor as Dr. Charles Reed (uncredited)
 1992 Dust Devil as Sergeant Ben Mukurob
 1993 Slaughter of the Innocents as Library Janitor
 1995 Outbreak as Dr. Benjamin Iwabi
 1995 Waterworld as Priam
 1995 Vampire in Brooklyn as Dr. Zeko
 1997 Waterworld: The Quest For Dry Land as Priam
 1998 Krippendorf's Tribe as Sulukim
 1998 Oz (TV Series) as Kepkemie Jara
 2000 The West Wing (TV Series) as President Nimbala
 2002  Mr. Monk and the Marathon Man (TV Series) as Tonday (final appearance)

References

External links
 

 
Tony Awards

1934 births
2009 deaths
American male film actors
American male stage actors
American male television actors
People from Johannesburg
South African male stage actors
South African expatriates in the United Kingdom
South African emigrants to the United States
Tony Award winners
South African male film actors
20th-century American male actors